The Cumberland Plain Woodland, or Western Sydney woodland, is a grassy woodland community found predominantly in Western Sydney, New South Wales, Australia, that comprises an open tree canopy, a groundcover with grasses and herbs, usually with layers of shrubs and/or small trees. 

Situated in the Cumberland Plain, the Cumberland Plain Woodland (CPW) is a savanna that features dry sclerophyll woodlands, grasslands and/or forests, reminiscent of Mediterranean forests. According to Office of Environment and Heritage, the community falls predominantly within the Coastal Valley Grassy Woodlands region, which are part of the Grassy Woodlands formation found in the eastern corridor of New South Wales. 

Currently, less than 6% of the Woodlands remain in small parts distributed across the western suburbs of Sydney, totaling only around 6400 hectares. Cumberland Plain Woodland was listed as an Endangered Ecological Community under the Threatened Species Conservation Act 1995 in June 1997. The greatest threats to the Cumberland Plain Woodland include land clearing for agriculture, urban sprawl and the introduction of harmful weed species.

Geography

In 1877, Cumberland Plain Woodlands covered 107,000 hectares and filled around 30% of the Sydney Basin. At the time of European land exploration of Australia European settlement, the Cumberland Plain contained 1,070 km² of woodlands and forests. The westward expansion of Sydney over the plain has placed enormous pressure on the woodlands and other local ecological communities, only 6% of which remain uncleared. The ecoregion contains clay soils derived from Wianamatta Shale to the west of Sydney CBD, where it receives 750–900 mm of annual rainfall.

The soils of the plain are infertile by world standards, but are not so by Australian standards. The plain is made up of eucalypt woodland with a grassy undergrowth and sclerophyllous (hard-leaved) shrub stratum, demarcating with the heath and forest communities of the sandstone plateaus that surround the plain. The biotic community is mostly found on flat or hilly terrains up to about 350 m in elevation, but it may also be present on locally precipitous sites and at slightly higher elevations. Some parts of the community may have a forest structure. The Woodland features an open tree canopy, groundcover prevailed by grasses and herbs, sometimes with layers of shrubs and small trees.

Locations
Spanning through the cities of Fairfield, Liverpool, Blacktown, Cumberland, Campbelltown, Camden and Penrith, with the cities of Canterbury-Bankstown, Hawkesbury, Parramatta and Wollondilly being on the peripheries, they contain approximately 2000 ha (one-fifth) of the remaining Cumberland Plain Woodland. Its range does not extend to slightly wetter Sydney Turpentine-Ironbark Forest, or high-rainfall ridges (such as Blue Gum High Forest in the upper North Shore), which are geologically on the Hornsby Plateau.

Examples of the remnants can be seen at Scheyville National Park, Rosford Street Reserve, Brenan Park, Central Gardens Nature Reserve, Fairfield Park Precinct, Prospect Hill, Prospect Nature Reserve, Western Sydney Regional Park, Wetherill Park Nature Reserve and Chipping Norton Lake, among other places.

Ecological communities

The Cumberland Plain Woodland, classed under Coastal Valley Grassy Woodlands, includes these ecological communities, with some overlapping and others plainly being sub-regions of the Woodland:
Cumberland Shale Hills Woodland – It is one of the widespread grassy woodland communities within Cumberland Plain Woodland and is restricted to mean annual rainfall of between 750 and 900 millimetres and elevations between 50 and 350 metres above sea level. An open woodland mainly containing grey box (Eucalyptus moluccana and Eucalyptus microcarpa) and forest red gum trees, it is mostly prevalent in Prospect near Prospect Reservoir, and also on the western edges of Fairfield City, Campbelltown LGA and Liverpool LGA.
Cumberland Moist Shale Woodlands – Located in protected areas that are intermediate between Cumberland Plain Woodland on drier areas and the Western Sydney Dry Rainforest, the community has waxy-leaved shrubs and small trees in the understorey with a ground cover of herbs, fleshy twiners and grasses, which are usually absent in the surrounding grassy woodlands. Similar to its subgroup Western Sydney Dry Rainforest due to its moist habit, some of its species would include hairy clerodendrum (Clerodendrum tomentosum) and slender grape (Cayratia clematidea). Although most of its habitat has been cleared for housing and urbanization, where only 604 ha remain intact, there are pockets of it in the southwest parts of the Fairfield City Council area, northwest of Liverpool near Green Valley, Cecil Hills and the Wollondilly LGA.
Western Sydney Dry Rainforest – Predominantly cleared within the Cumberland Plain and a component of Moist Shale Woodlands, it occurs on the secured clay-rich soils of the wavy hills and ranges of western Sydney in around Abbotsbury near Calmsley Hill City Farm, and areas in the MacArthur region to the southwest, albeit in a very small isolated pocket. Grey myrtle (Backhousia myrtifolia) is the most prevalent species with a ground cover being sparsely made up of herbs and ferns. Other salient species include fig (Ficus rubiginosa), wild quince (Alectryon subcinereus) and whalebone tree (Streblus brunonianus). The rainforest canopy may include spotted gums, wattles and paperbarks. Shrubs such as hairy clerodendrum (Clerodendrum tomentosum) and large mock olive (Notelaea longifolia) are also present. Rainfall is usually below 900 millimeters per annum in the rainforests within Cumberland Plain.
Cumberland Shale Plains Woodland and Shale-Gravel Transition Forest – Featuring a soft topography, it is an open grassy woodland mainly containing grey boxes, forest red gums, spotted gums and ironbarks. It features shale-influenced, nutrient-poor sandy soils that support a constituents of ironstone gravels. It ranges from a woodland to a forest with an understorey that may deviate between dense shrubs and a low thin shrub with an abundant ground cover of tussock grasses, shrubs and forbs. It was once was the most common variety of native vegetation in what is now western Sydney where it occurred on flat to undulating or craggy landscape at elevations reaching approximately 350 m above sea level. Only 10% of it remaining, the community is mostly found in Prospect, Wetherill Park, Prospect and Greystanes, Cecils Hills, Liverpool LGA, Marsden Park, Holsworthy and near Bankstown, albeit in small fragments of less than 5 hectares.  The Shale-Gravel Transition Forest is grouped with the Shale Plains Woodlands by the EPBC Act, although the two have been differentiated.

Gallery

Vegetation

The vegetation of the ecoregion includes grasslands, savanna, open woodlands, and some patches of sclerophyll forest lying on a nutrient-poor alluvium that was deposited by the Nepean River from sandstone and shale bedrock in the Blue Mountains. Despite this, they support a tremendous regional biodiversity.

The grassy woodland is dominated by Grey Box (Eucalyptus moluccana) and Forest Red Gum (E. tereticornis), with Narrow-leaved Ironbark (Eucalyptus crebra), Spotted Gum (Corymbia maculata) and Thin-leaved Stringybark (Eucalyptus eugenioides) occurring sporadically. The ecoregion may have an open layer of small trees that would include such species of Acacia decurrens, Acacia parramattensis, Acacia implexa and Exocarpos cupressiformis. The shrub layer is mainly contains Bursaria spinosa, indigofera australis, Hardenbergia violacea, Daviesia ulicifolia, Lespedeza cuneata, Dillwynia, Dodonaea viscosa, with plenty grasses such as Kangaroo Grass (Themeda australis) and Weeping Meadow Grass (Microlaena stipoides).

Eucalyptus species:
Eucalyptus amplifolia (cabbage gum)
Eucalyptus sieberi (Silvertop Ash) 
Eucalyptus oblonga (stringybark) 
Eucalyptus capitellata (brown stringybark)
Corymbia gummifera (red bloodwood)
Eucalyptus racemosa (scribbly gum)
Eucalyptus baueriana (blue box)
Eucalyptus longifolia (woollybutt)
Eucalyptus paniculata (grey ironbark)
Eucalyptus punctata (grey gum)
Eucalyptus melliodora (yellow box)

Non-eucalyptus trees:

Acacia parramattensis (Parramatta wattle)
Acacia longifolia (Sydney golden wattle)
Melaleuca alternifolia (snow-in-summer)
Melaleuca decora (white feather honeymyrtle)
Melaleuca styphelioides (prickly-leaved paperbark)
Alectryon subcinereus (native quince)
Allocasuarina torulosa (forest oak)
Tristaniopsis laurina (water gum)
Melia azedarach (chinaberry tree)
Backhousia myrtifolia (carrol ironwood)
Notelaea longifolia (large mock-olive)
Casuarina cunninghamiana
Syncarpia glomulifera (turpentine tree) 
Clerodendrum tomentosum (hairy clairy)
Bursaria spinosa
Melicytus dentatus (tree violet) 
Acacia floribunda (white sallow wattle)
Angophora bakeri (narrow-leaved)
Angophora subvelutina (broad-leaved apple)
Acacia decurrens (black wattle)

Shrubs:
Pittosporum revolutum (yellow pittosporum)
Solanum prinophyllum (forest nightshade)
Breynia oblongifolia (coffee bush)
Dichondra repens (kidney weed)
Ajuga australis (Austral bugle)
Daucus glochidiatus (Australian carrot)
Centella asiatica (Asiatic pennywort)
Solanum cinereum (Narrawa burr)
Crassula sieberiana (Australian stonecrop)
Aphanopetalum resinosum (gum vine)
Pandorea pandorana (Wonga Wonga vine)
Cayratia clematidea (native grape)
Hardenbergia violacea (purple coral pea)
Cheilanthes distans (bristly cloak fern)
Chrysocephalum apiculatum (yellow buttons)
Pratia purpurascens (white root)
Arthropodium milleflorum (pale vanilla lily)
Chenopodium hastatum (berry Saltbush)
Schenkia spicata
Veronica plebeia (trailing speedwell)
Stackhousia viminea 
Cestrum nocturnum (night-blooming jasmine)
Rubus parvifolius (Australian raspberry)
Ozothamnus diosmifolius (rice flower)
Glycine tabacina (variable glycine)

Grasses and sedge:
Cyperus gracilis (slender flat sedge)
Oplismenus hirtellus (basket grass)
Bothriochloa macra (red-leg grass)
Fimbristylis dichotoma (eight day grass)
Panicum effusum (hairy panic)
Sorghum leiocladum (wild sorghum)
Chloris truncata (Australian fingergrass)

Wildlife

Bird species in the woodland include (which are mostly vulnerable and/or endangered): 

Gang Gang Cockatoo 
Glossy Black-cockatoo
Brown Treecreeper
Painted Honeyeater
Swift Parrot
Square-tailed Kite
Hooded Robin
Black-chinned Honeyeater
Turquoise Parrot
Barking Owl
Powerful Owl
Speckled Warbler
Diamond Firetail
Masked Owl
Sooty Owl
Regent Honeyeater

Mammals:

Large-eared Pied Bat
Spotted-tail Quoll
Eastern False Pipistrelle
Eastern Bent-wing Bat
Eastern Freetail Bat
Large-footed Myotis
Yellow-bellied Glider
Squirrel Glider
Koala
Yellow-bellied sheath-tailed bat
Greater Broad-nosed Bat

Historical description
In April 1788, Governor Arthur Phillip describes the land west of Parramatta:

The country through which they travelled was singularly fine, level, or rising in small hills of a very pleasing and picturesque appearance. The soil excellent, except in a few small spots where it was stony. The trees growing at a distance of from 20 to 40 feet [6–12 metres] from each other, and in general entirely free from brushwood, which was confined to the stony and barren spots.

In 1818, author and settler James Atkinson describes the plain as: 

One immense tract of forest land extends, with little interruption, from below Windsor, on the Hawkesbury to Appin, a distance of 50 miles...Forest means land more or less furnished with timber trees, and invariably covered with grass underneath, and destitute of underwood...The whole of this tract, and indeed all the forest in this county, was thick forest land, covered with very heavy timber, chiefly iron and stringy bark, box, blue and other gums, and mahogany. 

In 1819, British explorer William Wentworth describes Cumberland Plain's natural landscape between Liverpool and Nepean River:

The soil changes to a thin layer of vegetable mould, resting on a stratum of yellow clay, which is again supported by a deep bed of schistus. The trees of the forest are here of the most stately dimensions. Full sized gums and iron barks, along side of which the loftiest trees in this country would appear as pigmies, with the beefwood tree, or as it is generally termed, the forest oak, which is of much humbler growth, are the usual timber. 

The forest is extremely thick, but there is little or no underwood. A poor sour grass, which is too effectually sheltered from the rays of the sun, to be possessed of any nutritive and fattening properties, shoots up in the intervals.

At this distance, however, the aspect of the country begins rapidly to improve. The forest is less thick, and the trees in general are of another description; the iron barks, yellow gums, and forest oaks disappearing, and the stringy barks, blue gums, and box trees, generally usurping their stead. When you have advanced about  further into the interior, you are at length gratified with the appearance of a country truly beautiful. An endless variety of hill and dale, clothed in the most luxuriant herbage, and covered with bleating flocks and lowing herds, at length indicate that you are in regions fit to be inhabited by civilized man. The soil has no longer the stamp of barrenness. A rich loam resting on a substratum of fat red clay, several feet in depth, is found even on the tops of the highest hills, which in general do not yield in fertility to the valleys. 

The timber, strange as it may appear, is of inferior size, though still of the same nature, i. e. blue gum, box, and stringy bark. There is no underwood, and the number of trees upon an acre do not upon an average exceed thirty. They are, in fact, so thin, that a person may gallop without difficulty in every direction. Coursing the kangaroo is the favourite amusement of the colonists, who generally pursue this animal at full speed on horseback, and frequently manage, notwithstanding its extraordinary swiftness, to be up at the death; so trifling are the impediments occasioned by the forest.

See also
Cumberland Plain
Ecology of Sydney
Sclerophyll
Geography of Sydney
List of endangered ecological communities in NSW
Lowland Grassy Woodland

References

External links
Cumberland Plain Woodland in the Sydney Basin Bioregion - profile
Ecology of Cumberland Plain Woodland

Endangered ecological communities
Geography of Sydney
Grasslands of Australia
Remnant urban bushland
Vegetation of Australia
Ecoregions of New South Wales
Temperate grasslands, savannas, and shrublands
Sclerophyll forests